Afanasie Chiriac (born 27 March 1891 in Corjova, Tighina County, Bessarabia; died 21 October 1977 in Iaşi) was a Bessarabian politician.

Biography 
He served as Member of the Moldovan Parliament (1917–1918). On 27 March 1918 he voted for the Union of Bessarabia with Romania. He has worked at various public institutions in Chișinău. From the evidence of security, it appears that he is not known with political activity, neither before nor after August 23, 1944. During the communist period, he did not maintain relations with the other members of the Moldovan Parliament or with other Bassarabians.

Gallery

See also
 Sfatul Țării

Bibliography 
Gheorghe E. Cojocaru, Sfatul Țării: itinerar, Civitas, Chişinău, 1998, 
Mihai Taşcă, Sfatul Țării şi actualele autorităţi locale, "Timpul de dimineaţă", no. 114 (849), June 27, 2008 (page 16)

External links 
 Arhiva pentru Sfatul Tarii
 Deputaţii Sfatului Ţării şi Lavrenti Beria

Notes

1891 births
1977 deaths
Moldovan MPs 1917–1918
Romanian people of Moldovan descent